The discography of American DJ and dubstep producer Seven Lions consists of one studio album, eight extended plays, thirty singles and sixteen remixes.

Extended plays and albums 

: The release date of digital download version is April 5, 2019.

Singles

As lead artist

As Abraxis

Remixes

Compilations

References 

Discographies of American artists
Electronic music discographies